The Guggenheim Museums are a group of museums in different parts of the world established (or proposed to be established) by the Solomon R. Guggenheim Foundation.

Museums in this group include:

Locations

Americas 
 The Solomon R. Guggenheim Museum in New York, New York, United States (1937–present)
 The Guggenheim Museum SoHo, a branch of the Guggenheim Museum located in Manhattan's SoHo neighborhood (1992–2001)
 The Guggenheim Guadalajara in Guadalajara, Mexico (2007–2009)
 The Guggenheim Hermitage Museum in Las Vegas, Nevada, United States (2001–2008)

Europe 
 The Guggenheim Museum Bilbao in Bilbao, Spain (1997–present)
 The Peggy Guggenheim Collection in Venice, Italy – originally the private collection of Peggy Guggenheim (1951–present)
 The Deutsche Guggenheim in Berlin, Germany (funded by Deutsche Bank; 1997–2013)

Middle East 
 The Guggenheim Abu Dhabi, a planned museum in the United Arab Emirates (under construction)

See also
 Guggenheim family
 Guggenheim (disambiguation)

References

Solomon R. Guggenheim Foundation
Guggenheim Museums